ANT1 Prime was a speciality service from ANT1 Group, who owns the popular Greek network ANT1.  It featured classic programming from ANT1 including top-rated series, live soccer matches as well as music content.

ANT1 Prime was available only in North America on Dish Network.

History
ANT1 20 Years Channel launched in September 2002 on Nova (Greece's satellite provider) as ANT1 Gold. On 6 September 2007, ANT1 Gold was removed from the NOVA lineup due as the two sides failed to reach an agreement.

ANT1 Gold launched on Dish Network in the United States in the fall of 2006.

On occasion, ANT1 Gold served as an alternate channel for ANT1 Satellite, airing live basketball and soccer matches. When 2 games were scheduled at the same time, one would air on ANT1 Satellite and the other on ANT1 Gold.

In early 2010, the channel was renamed ANT1 20 years The Channel, in honour of the 20th anniversary of ANT1 TV.

On 27 April 2011, ANT1 20 years The Channel was re-branded as 'ANT1 Prime' and the programming was expanded to include live sports as well as extensive music content. On 26 September 2012, ANT1 Prime was dropped from the Dish Network lineup, the channel subsequently ceased operations.

Programming
Series
Deligiannio Parthenagogio (comedy-drama)
Gia Mia Gynaika kai Ena Autokinito (drama)
Idaitera gia Klamata (comedy)
Kalimera Zoi (popular soap opera)
Lampsi (popular soap opera)
Tmhma Hthon (drama)

Music
All The Money Honey
Blue Bouzouki
Blue Diamonds

Other
Geusi Apo Ellada (cooking show)
Kalomeleta kai Erhetai (variety)
Proinos Kafes (popular entertainment program)
Thisavrofilakio (game show)

Logos

See also
ANT1
List of programs broadcast by ANT1

Defunct television networks in the United States
Defunct television channels in Greece
Greek-language television stations
Television channels and stations established in 2011
Television channels and stations disestablished in 2012
2011 establishments in Greece
2012 disestablishments in Greece
ANT1 Group